Junctophilin-1 is a protein that in humans is encoded by the JPH1 gene.

Junctional complexes between the plasma membrane and endoplasmic/sarcoplasmic reticulum are a common feature of all excitable cell types and mediate cross talk between cell surface and intracellular ion channels. The protein encoded by this gene is a component of junctional complexes and is composed of a C-terminal hydrophobic segment spanning the endoplasmic/sarcoplasmic reticulum membrane and a remaining cytoplasmic domain that shows specific affinity for the plasma membrane. This gene is a member of the junctophilin gene family.

References

Further reading